Niesa Evett Johnson (born February 7, 1973)  is a retired American women's basketball player with the Charlotte Sting of the Women's National Basketball Association (WNBA) from 1999 to 2000.

College
Johnson attended the University of Alabama and was a two-time All-American with the Crimson Tide. She was also a Naismith Award finalist. As of March 2006, Johnson had scored the second most points in Alabama women's basketball history. She helped the 6th seeded Alabama squad reach the 1994 Final Four. In 2006, Johnson was named to the 25th anniversary team of the Southeastern Conference.

Team statistics
Source

USA Basketball
Johnson was named to the USA U18 team (then called the Junior World Championship Qualifying Team) in 1992. The team competed in Guanajuato, Mexico in August 1992. The team won their first four games, then lost 80–70 to Brazil, finishing with the silver medal for the event, but qualifying for the 1993 world games. Johnson averaged 9.6 points per game during the event.

Johnson continued with the team to the 1993 U19 World Championship (then called the Junior World Championship). The team won five games and lost two, but that left them in seventh place. Johnson averaged 8.6 points per game and recorded 12 assists, highest on the team.

Johnson was invited to play with the team representing the US at the 1996 William Jones Cup competition held in Taipei, Taiwan. The team won all nine games to win the gold medal. Johnson averaged 4.2 points per game.

References

External links
Niesa Johnson Statistics

1973 births
Living people
Alabama Crimson Tide women's basketball players
All-American college women's basketball players
American women's basketball players
Atlanta Glory players
Basketball players from Chicago
Charlotte Sting players
Long Beach Stingrays players
Parade High School All-Americans (girls' basketball)
Point guards
Seattle Reign (basketball) players